Chamaeleon is a genus of plants in the Asteraceae family. They are native to an area from the Western Mediterranean to Pakistan.

Accepted species
There are five accepted species in this genus, as of May 2021:

Chamaeleon comosus 
Chamaeleon cuneatus 
Chamaeleon gummifer 
Chamaeleon macrocephalus 
Chamaeleon macrophyllus

References

 
Asteraceae genera